Patrizia Ritondo (born 18 September 1974) is a former Italian long-distance runner who competed at individual senior level at the IAAF World Half Marathon Championships.

References

External links
 

1974 births
Living people
Italian female long-distance runners
Sportspeople from Palermo